Cradlepoint is a Boise, Idaho-based technology company that develops cloud-managed wireless edge networking equipment. The company was founded in 2006. Swedish telecommunications company Ericsson completed its acquisition of the company in November 2020.

History

Cradlepoint was founded in 2006 in Boise, Idaho, by Pat Sewall, who later brought on co-founders Ryan Adamson and Gary Oliviero. Its first products were 3G and 4G cellular routers that created Wi-Fi hotspots for mobile internet. One of its early customers was aerospace defense organization NORAD, which used a Cradlepoint cellular router to connect 1,500 volunteers with roughly 140,000 calls per year coming from children trying to speak with Santa Claus.

In December 2015, Cradlepoint acquired Los Gatos, CA-based networking company Pertino.

In August 2016, the company announced the Cradlepoint NetCloud platform, a software-defined Wide Area Network (SD-WAN) architecture for businesses to manage their wired and wireless networks.

In March 2017, the company received $89 million in funding from new investor Technology Crossover Ventures (TCV).

In January 2018, the company launched its NetCloud Solution subscription model, bundling its hardware and software into annual or multi-year subscriptions.

In January 2020, the company introduced additional analytics capabilities to its NetCloud management platform, to help businesses manage their wireless network charges. In May, the company introduced its E3000 5G compatible edge router.  In September, the company announced it was being acquired by Swedish telecommunications company Ericsson, but would continue to operate as Cradlepoint.  The purchase closed in November 2020, with the company continuing as a standalone subsidiary within Ericsson’s Business Area Technologies and New Businesses segment.

Products
Cradlepoint develops routers, gateways and software for wireless WAN edge networking, using 4G and 5G wireless signals to connect businesses and other mobile users such as remote front-line emergency workers. The company uses a subscription model that combines its cloud-delivered software as SaaS, with hardware, support and training.

The company's E3000 5G-compatible edge router allows satellite offices or small businesses to use a gigabit LTE cellular signal to create a Wi-Fi network using the latest IEEE 802.11ax standard, commonly known as Wi-Fi 6. Modular 5G modems can be customized for compatibility with individual carriers' 5G networks.

The company's NetCloud platform manages the company's 4G LTE-enabled routers and M2M/IoT gateways.  The platform also combines cloud, software-defined networking (SDN) and Network Function Virtualization (NFV) technologies, known as Network as a service.

As of November 2020, the company said it was certifying its equipment with carriers to ensure that its 5G equipment was compatible with the different versions of the technology.

Operations
The company is headquartered in Boise, Idaho, operates a research and development center in Silicon Valley, and has international offices in the UK and Australia. In September 2020, the company announced it had over 20,000 customers, 1,500 channel partners, and over 1 million SaaS subscriptions. The company has 700 employees as of November 2020.

References

External links
 Official website

Networking companies of the United States
American companies established in 2006
Telecommunications companies established in 2006
2006 establishments in Idaho
Companies based in Boise, Idaho
Ericsson
2020 mergers and acquisitions
American subsidiaries of foreign companies
Networking hardware companies